Electra High School is a public high school in Electra, Texas.  It is part of the Electra Independent School District located in western Wichita County. In 2013, Electra High School was rated "Improvement Required" by the Texas Education Agency.

Student demographics
As of the 2005–2006 school year, Electra High School had a total of 165 students. Of the students, 76.4% were white, 15.2% were Hispanic, 7.3% were African American, 0.6% were Asian/Pacific Islander, and 0.6% were Native American.

Of Electra High School's students, 31.5% are considered economically disadvantaged.

Athletics
The Electra Tigers and Lady Tigers compete in cross country, volleyball, football, basketball, power lifting, golf, tennis, track, softball, and baseball.

State Titles
Football 
1985(2A)
Boys Track 
1919(1A), 1923(1A), 1927(All)

Organizations
Band, One-Act Play, NHS, Student Council, Cheerleading, FFA, FCA, Yearbook, and Newspaper

State Titles
Electra Tiger Pride Band
2007 (state-finalist under Kenneth Gilbreath), 2011 (state-participant under Jim Strahan)
One-Act Play (1A)
 "Home Fires" by Jack Heifner (2010), "Sending Down The Sparrows" by Laura Lundgren Smith (2011) (participants under Janis Blackwell and Brenda Beebe)
Speech and Debate (1A)
Under the direction of Brenda Beebe, Electra High School obtained three consecutive district speech team championships (2010–2012) and a regional championship (2012). Two students advanced to the State UIL Championships, Joe Hatfield and Bre'Onna Word. The team placed 4th in Texas in 2012.
 4th ranked UIL State Speech Team (2012).
Joe Hatfield (2012) — State Champion in Informative Speaking and State Champion Runner-Up in Lincoln Douglas Debate. 
Bre'Onna Word (2012) — 6th in State in Prose Interpretation.

Alumni

 Rudy Perez 1989, Valedictorian, Current H.E.B. Food and Drug Executive
 Robert Craighead, Jr. Class of 1979 Hollywood Actor, Singer, Producer

References

External links

Electra ISD

Schools in Wichita County, Texas
Public high schools in Texas